Jack Hakim (born 10 October 1931) is an Egyptian former swimmer. He competed in the men's 400 metre freestyle at the 1948 Summer Olympics and the water polo tournament at the 1952 Summer Olympics.

References

External links
 

1931 births
Possibly living people
Egyptian male swimmers
Egyptian male water polo players
Olympic swimmers of Egypt
Olympic water polo players of Egypt
Swimmers at the 1948 Summer Olympics
Water polo players at the 1952 Summer Olympics
Place of birth missing (living people)
20th-century Egyptian people